The Sânmiclăuș is a right tributary of the river Ier in Romania. It flows into the Ier near Sudurău.

References

 Memoriu privind planul de apărare împotriva inundațiilor  Satu Mare 

Rivers of Romania
Rivers of Satu Mare County